Claudelands is a suburb directly to the east of central Hamilton, New Zealand, across the Waikato River.  It is linked to the central city by the Claudelands road bridge and the East Coast Main Trunk Railway bridge.

History
Miropiko Pā, at River Road, in the north-west of Claudelands, was occupied by Ngāti Wairere, Ngāti Hānui and Ngāti Koura. Following the 1864 invasion of the Waikato they moved to Gordonton and the land was confiscated and sold by the government.

Alfred William East, a captain with the 4th Waikato Regiment, was one of the original owners of Claudelands. East Street in the suburb is named for him. Francis Richard Claude was an early wealthy settler from South America who bought  of parcels of mainly swampy land from the original soldier-settlers who were disgruntled with their land allocation. Claude subdivided most of it in 1878. An area of kahikatea forest was then cleared to create the racecourse. It was sold to the South Auckland Racing Club and then the Waikato A&P Association, who had their first show on 27 October 1892. Racing moved to Te Rapa Racecourse in 1925.

The only piece of land in near original state is the  kahikatea forest, named Claudelands Bush, adjacent to Claudelands show grounds. Originally the ground in this area was swampy but artificial drainage has dried the soil. The roots of the trees are protected by an elevated walkway which is open to the public. The A&P Association gave it to the city council in 1928.

Claudelands is one of Hamilton's oldest suburbs, with a large number of bay villas and bungalows dating from the late 19th and early 20th centuries. Although later development led to the construction of a large number of two-storey blocks of flats, the unique character of the area was deemed worthy of preservation by the Hamilton City Council.  To this end, strict rules governing alteration, demolition and new development were introduced.

Features of Claudelands

Claudelands is home to the Claudelands Showgrounds - original site of major agricultural shows and events in Hamilton, and a trotting and dog racing track.  Since passing into council ownership, a large part of it (including the race track) has been converted into a large open park. The upgraded Claudelands Arena was opened in 2011. The Claudelands Event Centre hosted a mayoral debate in 2019.

Claudelands is also home of one of Hamilton's oldest and most notable association football clubs, Claudelands Rovers.

Claudelands railway station 
Claudelands had a railway station from 1884 to 1991.

In 2020 double tracking and potentially reopening the station for events, were put forward as a COVID-19 recovery scheme, as part of a $150m scheme to relay tracks to Cambridge.

Demographics 

Claudelands had a population of 6,732 at the 2018 New Zealand census, an increase of 411 people (6.5%) since the 2013 census, and an increase of 738 people (12.3%) since the 2006 census. There were 2,478 households, comprising 3,405 males and 3,324 females, giving a sex ratio of 1.02 males per female, with 1,134 people (16.8%) aged under 15 years, 1,839 (27.3%) aged 15 to 29, 2,772 (41.2%) aged 30 to 64, and 987 (14.7%) aged 65 or older.

Ethnicities were 63.1% European/Pākehā, 20.5% Māori, 5.5% Pacific peoples, 20.5% Asian, and 4.5% other ethnicities. People may identify with more than one ethnicity.

The percentage of people born overseas was 30.9, compared with 27.1% nationally.

Although some people chose not to answer the census's question about religious affiliation, 41.5% had no religion, 36.3% were Christian, 1.7% had Māori religious beliefs, 6.4% were Hindu, 3.5% were Muslim, 1.0% were Buddhist and 4.2% had other religions.

Of those at least 15 years old, 1,659 (29.6%) people had a bachelor's or higher degree, and 762 (13.6%) people had no formal qualifications. 807 people (14.4%) earned over $70,000 compared to 17.2% nationally. The employment status of those at least 15 was that 2,643 (47.2%) people were employed full-time, 813 (14.5%) were part-time, and 279 (5.0%) were unemployed.

The Index of Socioeconomic Deprivation, ranked 1-10 from lowest to most deprived areas, lists both Claudelands and Peachgrove at 8/10 (high deprivation) in 2013.

Education
The school opened in 1957.

It caters for students aged between 5 and 21 with intellectual disability.

Southwell School is an private Anglican preparatory school (Year 1-8). The school was founded in 1911 and moved to its present site in 1921.

All these schools are coeducational. Rolls are as of

See also
List of streets in Hamilton
Suburbs of Hamilton, New Zealand

References

External links
 1879 map

Suburbs of Hamilton, New Zealand
Populated places on the Waikato River